Florian Kamberi (born 8 March 1995) is a professional footballer who plays as a forward for English Championship club Huddersfield Town and the Albania national team. Kamberi has previously played for Grasshopper, Karlsruher SC, Hibernian and Rangers. He represented Switzerland at the under-21 level, and has since been selected for the Albania squad.

Club career

Grasshoppers
Kamberi started his professional career with Swiss club Grasshoppers. On 31 August 2016, Kamberi was loaned to Karlsruher SC for the 2016–17 season in 2. Bundesliga.

Hibernian
Kamberi went on trial with Scottish Premiership club Hibernian in January 2018, and moved there on loan on 31 January. Kamberi made his debut for Hibernian later that day, and scored the first goal in a 2–1 win against Motherwell. Kamberi scored a hat-trick for Hibs on 3 April, in a 3–1 win against Hamilton.

In June 2018, Hibernian signed Kamberi to a three-year contract. Kamberi scored a hat-trick in a Europa League qualifier against NSÍ Runavík on 12 July.

Loan spell to Rangers
Kamberi moved on loan to Rangers on 31 January 2020. Following the end of this loan period, and after a period spent in Switzerland during the COVID-19 pandemic, Kamberi returned to Hibernian for pre-season training in June 2020.

St. Gallen
On 6 August 2020, Kamberi moved back to his native Switzerland to sign for St. Gallen on a three-year deal. Kamberi tested positive for COVID-19 in November 2020, and played infrequently for St. Gallen during the early part of the 2020–21 season.

Kamberi was released from his contract by St. Gallen on 23 June 2022.

Loan spell to Aberdeen
On 1 February 2021, Kamberi completed a loan switch back to Scotland to sign with Aberdeen until the end of the season.

Sheffield Wednesday (loan)
On 30 July 2021, Kamberi moved on a season-long loan deal to England to join recently relegated League One side Sheffield Wednesday. He would make his debut on the opening day of the season against Charlton Athletic coming off the bench to replace Callum Paterson after he suffered a nasty head injury. He scored his first goal for the club in a 2-0 win at Rotherham United on 21 August 2021.

Winterthur
On 7 July 2022, Kamberi signed with Winterthur. His contract with the club was cancelled on 29 November 2022.

Huddersfield Town
On 5 January 2023, Kamberi joined EFL Championship side Huddersfield Town on a short-term deal until the end of the season.

International career
Kamberi was born in Switzerland and is of Kosovan descent, which made him eligible to represent Switzerland, Kosovo and Albania. Kamberi played in youth internationals for Switzerland, and he scored for their under-21 team in a 1–1 draw against England in March 2016.

Kamberi was included in the Albania squad for the first time in November 2019. Delays in processing the paperwork required to transfer his international status from Switzerland to Albania, and a slight ankle injury, meant that he was unable to play in their matches with Andorra and France.

On 17 March 2021, Kamberi was called up by the Albania national team ahead of their World Cup Qualifiers against Andorra, England and San Marino.

Career statistics

References

1995 births
Living people
Footballers from Zürich
Kosovo Albanians
Swiss people of Kosovan descent
Swiss people of Albanian descent
Association football forwards
Swiss men's footballers
Switzerland youth international footballers
Albanian footballers
Kosovan footballers
Swiss Super League players
2. Bundesliga players
Scottish Professional Football League players
FC Rapperswil-Jona players
Grasshopper Club Zürich players
Karlsruher SC players
Hibernian F.C. players
Rangers F.C. players
FC St. Gallen players
Aberdeen F.C. players
Sheffield Wednesday F.C. players
FC Winterthur players
Huddersfield Town A.F.C. players
English Football League players
Swiss expatriate footballers
Expatriate footballers in Germany
Swiss expatriate sportspeople in Germany
Expatriate footballers in Scotland
Swiss expatriate sportspeople in Scotland
Expatriate footballers in England
Swiss expatriate sportspeople in England
Kosovan Christians
Albanian Christians